Ogden Elementary School may refer to:
 The elementary division of Ogden International School in Chicago, Illinois
 Ogden Elementary School - Hewlett-Woodmere School District - Valley Stream, New York
 Ogden Elementary School - New Hanover County Schools - Wilmington, North Carolina